José Alonso Lara (born 7 March 2000) is a Spanish professional footballer who plays for Betis Deportivo Balompié as a left winger.

Club career
Born in Seville, Andalusia, Lara represented Sevilla FC as a youth. On 28 October 2016, while still a youth, he signed his first professional contract by agreeing to a deal until 2019.

On 3 December 2017, aged only 17, Lara made his professional debut with the reserves by starting in a 1–1 Segunda División home draw against CD Lugo. He scored his first goal the following 28 April, netting the game's only in a home defeat of AD Alcorcón.

Lara made his first team – and La Liga – debut on 19 May 2018, coming on as a late substitute for Nolito in a 1–0 home win against Deportivo Alavés. On 11 September 2020, he was loaned to Deportivo de La Coruña, freshly relegated to the third division, for one year.

Lara terminated his contract with Sevilla on 1 July 2021, and moved to crosstown rivals Real Betis twelve days later, being assigned to the B-team in Primera División RFEF.

Honours

International
Spain U17
UEFA European Under-17 Championship: Champion 2017
FIFA Under-17 World Cup: Runner-up 2017

Spain U18
Mediterranean Games: Gold Medal 2018

References

External links

2000 births
Living people
Footballers from Seville
Spanish footballers
Association football wingers
La Liga players
Segunda División players
Primera Federación players
Segunda División B players
Sevilla Atlético players
Sevilla FC players
Deportivo de La Coruña players
Betis Deportivo Balompié footballers
Spain youth international footballers
Competitors at the 2018 Mediterranean Games
Mediterranean Games gold medalists for Spain
Mediterranean Games medalists in football